Zurancham (also Romanized as Zūrāncham and Zaravān Cham) is a village in Teshkan Rural District, Chegeni District, Dowreh County, Lorestan Province, Iran. At the 2006 census, its population was 126, in 28 families.

References 

Towns and villages in Dowreh County